Chester Arthur Reynolds (1887 – December 11, 1958), was a Kansas City, Missouri, native and entrepreneur who was once the President of Lee Jeans, and later founded the National Cowboy & Western Heritage Museum (formerly National Cowboy Hall of Fame and Western Heritage Center).

Chester A. Reynolds Memorial Award
Named in honor of Reynolds, the "Chester A. Reynolds Memorial Award" is awarded each year during the National Cowboy & Western Heritage Museum's Western Heritage Awards.

References

External links
A Concise History of the National Cowboy & Western Heritage Museum

1887 births
1958 deaths
Businesspeople from Kansas City, Missouri
Museum founders
Non-traditional rodeo performers
20th-century philanthropists
20th-century American businesspeople